Ropp may refer to:

Surnames
Gordon Ropp, American farmer and politician
Robert S de Ropp, biochemist
Theodore Ropp, American military historian
William de Ropp, British intelligence agent
Eduard von der Ropp, Russian Roman Catholic archbishop

Locations
R.C. Ropp House, historic home in West Virginia, United States
Baker Ropp House, historic home in West Virginia, United States

Abbreviations
Roll-on Pilfer Proof - a type of screw cap where the thread is formed by pressure against the container